State Road 572 (NM 572) is a  state highway in the US state of New Mexico. NM 572's northern terminus is at NM 95, about .75 miles south of Rutheron, and the southern terminus is a continuation as NM 531 in La Puente.

Major intersections

See also

References

572
Transportation in Rio Arriba County, New Mexico